Rondò Veneziano is an Italian chamber orchestra, specializing in Baroque music, playing original instruments, but incorporating a rock-style rhythm section of synthesizer, bass guitar and drums, led by Maestro Gian Piero Reverberi, who is also the principal composer of all of the original Rondò Veneziano pieces. The unusual addition of modern instruments, more suitable for jazz, combined with Reverberi's arrangements and original compositions, have resulted in lavish novel versions of classical works over the years. As a rule in their concert tours, the musicians, mostly women, add to the overall Baroque effect wearing Baroque-era attire and coiffures.

Evolution
The orchestra's first decade of albums included only entirely original compositions in the style of the baroque rondò, "a musical composition built on the alternation of a principal recurring theme and contrasting episodes".

In later years, in addition to many new and original albums continuing Gian Piero Reverberi's own unique Rondò style and tradition, Rondò Veneziano also brought their fusion of classical and contemporary instruments to a small number of albums dedicated to some of the great composers of the classical and baroque tradition.

In an interview, Maestro Reverberi said on the sound of Rondò Veneziano: "Rondò Veneziano's music is first of all positive. Also when it seems to be sad, it's never sad. It's always positive in a sense that at the end there's always a good future. So I think that also the reason of the success it that it's music where you don't have to think negative or to feel negative or if you feel negative it should be something that brings you to think positive."

A version of "La Serenissima" (the theme from the album Venice in Peril) was released in the United Kingdom as a single and reached number 58 on the UK Singles Chart in October 1983. The track was also widely used at that time by BBC Television, as the theme tune to Hospital Watch. The track was later to feature on the globally successful Venice in Peril album which was released as part of an international campaign to save Venice from sinking into the lagoon.

In 1985, they provided the score for the movie Not Quite Jerusalem (known as Not Quite Paradise in the United States). This score was a reworking of many of the original pieces featured on the Venice in Peril and The Genius of Venice albums.

The orchestra has produced 70 albums since its founding in 1979.

Partial discography
All works composed by Gian Piero Reverberi, Ivano Pavesi and Laura Giordano:

Rondò veneziano (1980)
La Serenissima  (1981)
Notturno in gondola (1981)
Scaramucce  (1982)
Venezia 2000 (1983)
Concerto Futurissimo (1984)
Odissea Veneziana (1984)
Casanova  (1985)
Theme from Not Quite Jerusalem (1985)
Odissea Veneziana (1985)
Fantasia Veneziana (1986)
Lagune (1986)
Rapsodia Veneziana (1986)
Arabesque (1987)
Misteriosa Venezia (1987)
Concerto  (1988)
Poesia di Venezia (1988)
Armonie (1989)
Masquerade (1989)
Visioni di Venezia (1989)
Barocco  (1990)
Musica... Fantasia (1990)
The Genius of Mozart (1990)
The Genius of Vivaldi (1990)
Vivaldi, Mozart, Beethoven (1990)

Magica Melodia (1991)
Prestige (1991)
Stagioni di Venezia (1992)
Rondò 2000 (1992)
Venezia Romantica (1992)
Concerto per Beethoven (1993)
Concerto per Mozart (1993)
Concerto per Vivaldi (1993)
Il mago di Venezia (1994)
Back 2 back (1995)
Eine Nacht in Venedig (1995)
I grandi successi vol.1 (1995)
Sinfonia di Natale (1995)
I grandi successi vol. 2 (1996)
Preludio all'amore (1996)
Seduzione (1996)
The best of - vol. 1 (1996)
Die Grossen Erfolge (1997)
Fantasia Classica (1997)
I grandi successi (1997)
In concerto (1997)
Marco Polo  (1997)
Via dell'Amore (1997)

Fantasia d'Autunno (1998)
Fantasia d'Inverno (1998)
Zodiaco (1998)
Attimi Di Magia (1999)
Fantasia d'Estate (1999)
Fantasia di Primavera (1999)
Honeymoon - Luna di miele (1999)
Protagonisti vol. 1 (1999)
Splendore Di Venezia (1999)
I grandi successi (2000)
La storia del classico (2000)
Nur Das Beste (2000)
Protagonisti vol. 2 (2000)
The very best of (2000)
Capriccio veneziano (2001)
Papagena (2001)
3 originals (2001)
The Magic of Christmas (2001)
Concertissimo (2002)
La Piazza (2002)
Vénitienne (2002)
Nur Das Beste 2 (2004)
25 Live in Concert (2005)
Rondò Veneziano: Chamber Orchestra (2009)
Once upon a time (2010)

Arranged and produced by Gian Piero Reverberi

DVD productions
 Rondò Veneziano Once upon a time (2010)

References

External links
 Official website
 Not Quite Jerusalem at the IMDb

Sheet music
 Accademia

Baroque pop musicians
Chamber orchestras
Easy listening musicians
Italian orchestras
Music in Venice
Musical groups established in 1979
Musical groups from Veneto